England Made Me is the debut studio album by English indie rock band Black Box Recorder, whose members include Luke Haines, Sarah Nixey and John Moore, released in July 1998 via Chrysalis Records.

The chorus of the song "Child Psychology" featured a highly controversial line: "Life is unfair, kill yourself or get over it". This led to the song being banned on UK radio and MTV. However, the sardonic nature of the song also gained praise from critics, with one calling it 'refreshingly blunt'.  The single was released in the US shortly after the Columbine massacre, leading to the line "kill yourself" being censored on the US release.

The cover features a photograph of wrestler Adrian Street with his miner father taken in 1973 by Dennis Hutchinson at Beynon's Colliery in Blaina, Wales.

Track listing
All songs written by Luke Haines and John Moore, except for where noted.
"Girl Singing in the Wreckage" – 2:42
"England Made Me" – 4:00
"New Baby Boom" – 2:10
"It's Only the End of the World" – 5:21
"Ideal Home" – 2:39
"Child Psychology" – 4:08
"I. C. One Female" – 2:19
"Uptown Top Ranking" (Althea & Donna, Errol Thompson) – 3:57
"Swinging" – 3:52
"Kidnapping an Heiress" – 2:46
"Hated Sunday"  – 3:16

Bonus tracks
"Wonderful Life" – 2:16
"Seasons in the Sun" (Jacques Brel, Rod McKuen) – 2:40
"Factory Radio" – 2:13
"Lord Lucan Is Missing" (Doug Potter, Gary Turner) – 1:48

Personnel
Black Box Recorder
Sarah Nixey - vocals
John Moore - instruments
Luke Haines - instruments
Technical
Black Box Recorder (track 8), Martin Jenkins (tracks 2, 3, 10, 11), Pete Hofmann (tracks 5, 7, 9), Phil Vinall (track 1), Teo Miller (tracks 4, 6) - engineer
Phil Vinall (track 1), Teo Miller (tracks 2-11) - mixing
Dennis Hutchinson - cover photography

Charts

References

1998 debut albums
Black Box Recorder albums
Chrysalis Records albums
Albums produced by Phil Vinall